Ardyshly may refer to:
 Ardıclı, Azerbaijan
 Arduşlu, Azerbaijan